Joseph Foreman (19 May 1935 – 28 April 1999) was a Canadian sprinter. He competed in the men's 200 metres at the 1956 Summer Olympics. He finished second in the 1954 British Empire and Commonwealth Games 4 x 440 yards relay (with Terry Tobacco, Doug Clement, and Laird Sloan). In the 1954 British Empire and Commonwealth Games Foreman was eliminated in the heats of the 440 yards. He died in an automobile accident in 1999.

References

1935 births
1999 deaths
Athletes (track and field) at the 1956 Summer Olympics
Canadian male sprinters
Olympic track and field athletes of Canada
Athletes (track and field) at the 1954 British Empire and Commonwealth Games
Commonwealth Games silver medallists for Canada
Commonwealth Games medallists in athletics
Athletes from Toronto
Medallists at the 1954 British Empire and Commonwealth Games